Amsterdam RAI (Dutch: Rijwiel en Automobiel Industrie) is a railway station situated in southern Amsterdam, Netherlands. It is located between the two directions of the A10 Amsterdam ring road. It is also a metro station at which GVB runs two lines. RAI gets its name from the nearby Amsterdam RAI Exhibition and Convention Centre.

History
The original station opened in 1981 when it was a terminus station, with just one platform and the station had no signals. It was then possible to walk straight onto the GVB tramway line 4 (with Amsterdam Central Station as terminus) without changing platforms.

In 1988 the tram terminus moved to street level below the station. This was due to the building of Amsterdam Metro line 51 next to the railway station. This line began operating in 1990. The roof of the railway station was built in 1997. The new station was built in 1991 and Amsterdam RAI became an island platform station and then in 1993 the line was extended towards Weesp.

The design of the station is by architect Rob Steenhuis.

In 2012, an expansion of the station from 2 to 4 tracks was commenced. These works were completed in August 2016.

The station is named after the Amsterdam RAI Exhibition and Convention Centre building.

Service

Train
, the following train services call at this station:
2× per hour local Sprinter service Hoofddorp - Schiphol - Duivendrecht - Weesp - Almere
2× per hour local Sprinter service Hoofddorp - Schiphol - Duivendrecht - Weesp - Hilversum - Utrecht

During some conferences at the RAI, Intercity services stop here too.

Metro
GVB operates all Amsterdam city services and Metro lines 50 and 51 stop at Amsterdam RAI metro station which runs parallel with the NS railway.

50 Isolatorweg - Sloterdijk - Lelylaan - Zuid - RAI - Duivendrecht - Bijlmer ArenA - Holendrecht - Gein
51 Central Station - Amstel - Van der Madeweg - RAI - Zuid - Buitenveldert - Amstelveen

Tram
GVB operates one tram service to Amsterdam RAI.

4 Central Station - Rembrandtplein - Utrechtsestraat - Ceintuurbaan - RAI

Bus
This service is operated by GVB.

62 Station Lelylaan - Sloten - Hoofddorpplein - Haarlemmermeer - Stadionplein - VU - Buitenveldert - RAI - Station Amstel

External links
NS website 
Dutch Public Transport journey planner 

RAI
Railway stations opened in 1981
Railway stations on the Zuidtak Ringspoorbaan
RAI
Tram stops in Amsterdam
Amsterdam-Zuid